The Durham Open was a golf tournament on the PGA Tour that was played three times from 1944 to 1945. The tournament was held at the Hope Valley Country Club in Durham, North Carolina. Each tournament had a purse of $5,000 with a winner's share of $1,000 (cash value of war bonds).

In 1944, Craig Wood won the Durham Open for his last PGA Tour victory. In April 1945, Byron Nelson won the Durham Open for his 4th of 11 consecutive victories. Later in the year, amateur Frank Stranahan won by a stroke over Ed Oliver.

Winners

References

Former PGA Tour events
Golf in North Carolina
Sports in Durham, North Carolina
Recurring sporting events established in 1944
Recurring sporting events disestablished in 1945
1944 establishments in North Carolina
1945 disestablishments in North Carolina